Schignano is a comune (municipality) in the Province of Como in the Italian region Lombardy, located about  north of Milan and about  north of Como, on the border with Switzerland.

Schignano borders the following municipalities: Argegno, Brienno, Breggia (Switzerland), Carate Urio, Centro Valle Intelvi, Cerano d'Intelvi, Dizzasco, Moltrasio..

Twin towns
 Saint-Amé, France
 Cermenate, Italy

References

External links
Official website

Cities and towns in Lombardy